Sanghyon "Joseph" Cheong (born June 3, 1986) is a Korean-American professional poker player who is a World Series of Poker bracelet winner and a former finalist at the WSOP Main Event.

Cheong was born in Seoul, South Korea before moving to the United States at the age of 6. He earned degrees in psychology, math and economics from the University of California, San Diego.

Cheong played online poker under the screen name "subiime," compiling winnings of $3.7 million. In 2010, Cheong made the November Nine of the WSOP Main Event. He eventually finished in 3rd place, earning $4,130,049.

In 2012, Cheong finished runner-up in the $5,000 No Limit Hold'em Mixed Max event. He was also second in a $1,500 2-7 Draw Lowball event in 2014. Cheong finally won his first WSOP bracelet in 2019, outlasting a field of 6,214 in the $1,000 No Limit Hold'em Double Stack event to earn $687,782. He also finished fourth at the WSOP Europe Main Event in 2012 and has three WSOP circuit rings. In total, Cheong has 43 WSOP cashes and nearly $7 million in earnings.

As of 2019, Cheong's total live tournament winnings are nearly $14 million.

World Series of Poker bracelets

References

External links
Hendon Mob profile
WSOP.com profile

Living people
1986 births
American poker players
World Series of Poker bracelet winners
American people of Korean descent
People from Seoul
People from Las Vegas